Dunnellon High School is an American secondary school located in Dunnellon, FL. The school serves students from Marion, Levy and Citrus counties. The student population of 1050 is 58% majority and 42% minority.  Dunnellon High School is served by two magnet programs: The Advanced Studies Program and The Power Generation Academy.  The Advanced Studies Program is an academically accelerated program for students in Grades 9–12.  Fifty students in each grade take Honors, Advanced Placement, and Dual Enrollment classes on the DHS campus.  They also are assigned an adult mentor from the Administrative Team and participate in education and college field trips.  The Power Generation Academy allows students to learn about the production of power and energy, from multiple sources.  The program is supported by Duke Energy and is great for students interested in careers in engineering and power generation.

Curriculum
Dunnellon provides education from 9th through 12th Grades.  The school has been approved as an Early College site by the College of Central Florida and currently offers nine Dual Enrollment classes on campus, as well as eleven Advanced Placement courses. The following vocational programs are also offered: Health Occupations, Administrative Office Tech, Culinary Arts, Agriculture, Building Construction, Early Childhood Education, Digital Video Productions, Power Generation, Game Simulations, Web Design, and Teacher Assisting.  Arts programs in 2-D Art, 3-D Art, Band, Chorus, Guitar, and Theater are also offered.  Washington Post columnist Jay Mathews, in his annual America's Most Challenging High Schools Challenge Index rankings listed Dunnellon High School for the first time in 2015.

The school has an Air Force Junior Reserve Officer Training Corps (AFJROTC) program.

Sports
Dunnellon has won FHSAA state championships in Football (1978, 1979), Girls Basketball (1986), and Softball (2009, 2010).  Current NFL players Terrence Brooks and Lerentee McCray are Dunnellon High School graduates.  The Tiger Girls Basketball, Boys Basketball, and Softball teams all won district championships in 2015.

Notable alumni
Terrence Brooks, NFL player
Ricky Easmon, former NFL player
Lerentee McCray, NFL player
Ernie Mills, former NFL player

References

External links 
 Dunnellon High School website
 Marion County Public Schools website
 Ocala Star-Banner newspaper article about the Power Generation Academy

High schools in Marion County, Florida
Public high schools in Florida
1945 establishments in Florida
Educational institutions established in 1945